List of active synagogues in Iran

Tehran 
 Abdollah Zadeh Synagogue
 Abrishami Synagogue
 Aziz-Khan Synagogue
 Bagh-e Saba Synagogue (fa)
 Danial Synagogue (Polish)
 Darvazeh Dowlat Synagogue
 Ettefagh Synagogue (Iraqi)
 Ettehad Synagogue
 Ezra Yaghoub Synagogue
 Fakhrabad Synagogue
 Gisha Synagogue
 Gorgan Synagogue
 Haim Synagogue
 Hakim Asher Synagogue
 HaRambam Synagogue (Rambam Synagogue)
 Kohan Synagogue
 Kourosh Synagogue
 Khorasaniha Synagogue (Mashhadi)
 Levian Synagogue
 Mahariv Synagogue
 Molla Hanina Synagogue
 Nosrat Synagogue
 Orsharga Synagogue
 Pol-e Choobi Synagogue
 Rafi-Nia Synagogue
 Rah-e Danesh Synagogue
 Seyed-Khandan Synagogue
 Tafian (Hakim) (Pesyan) Synagogue (fa)
 Tarasht Synagogue
 Yousefabad Synagogue
 Yousefzadeh Synagogue
 Zargarian Synagogue

Shiraz 
 Bozorg Synagogue
 Delrahim Synagogue
 Gharbi Synagogue
 Hadash Synagogue (fa)
 Khaneh Javanan Synagogue
 Khorasaniha Synagogue
 Kohanim Synagogue
 Kowsar Synagogue
 Magen Haim Synagogue
 Molla Mishi Synagogue
 Molla Pinhas Synagogue
 Molla Owram Synagogue
 Movarekh Synagogue
 New Kazerouniha Synagogue
 Old Kazerouniha Synagogue
 Rabbizadeh Synagogue (fa)
 Sehati Synagogue
 Shokr Synagogue

Isfahan (fa) 
 Joubareh
 Serah bet Asher Shrine
 Molla Mari Shrine
 Amoo Shaya Synagogue (fa)
 Asiaban Synagogue (fa)
 Bozorg (Mirakhor) Synagogue (fa)
 Golbahar Synagogue (fa)
 Haj Elyahu Synagogue (fa)
 Hanasab Synagogue
 Jamaati Synagogue (fa)
 Keter David Synagogue (fa)
 Khorshidi Synagogue (fa)
 Kowsar Synagogue
 Molla David Synagogue (fa)
 Molla Neissan Synagogue (fa)
 Molla Rabbi Synagogue (fa)
 Molla Soleiman Synagogue
 Molla Yaghoub Synagogue (fa)
 Moshe Haya Synagogue (fa)
 Saeidian Synagogue
 Sang-Bast Synagogue (fa)
 Sarah bet Asher Synagogue
 Shmuel Geli Synagogue (fa)
 Shokrollah Synagogue (fa)
 Yaghoub bet Asher Synagogue
 Yousef Shmuel Shimon Synagogue (fa)

Yazd 
 Molla Agha Baba Synagogue (fa)
 Kamal Synagogue (fa) 
 Eliahu Hanavi Synagogue
 Eli Synagogue
 Hadash Synagogue
 Hakham Synagogue
 Mizan Synagogue
 Molla Shlomo Synagogue

Hamadan 
 Esther and Mordecai Shrine
 Habakkuk Shrine
 Alliance Synagogue
 Bozorg Synagogue
 Haggai Nabi Synagogue (fa) (fa) 
 Kalimian Synagogue
 Molla Abraham
 Molla Rabbi

Sanandaj 
 Bozorg Synagogue
 Koochik Synagogue

Kermanshah 
 Ettehad Synagogue
 Hadash (Novin) Synagogue
 Yaghoub Now Synagogue

Rafsanjan
 Ghadim (Old) Synagogue
 New Synagogue

Kerman 
 Kerman Synagogue

Bushehr 
 Kooti Synagogue

Tabriz 
 Koochik Synagogue

Urmia 
 Daneshgah-e Kalimi

Boroujerd 
 Boroujerd Synagogue

Babol 
 Khoshnoud Synagogue

Bibliography

References

 
Iran
Synagogue